Josef Pohnetal (14 March 1925 – 17 June 2008) was an Austrian cyclist. He competed in three events at the 1948 Summer Olympics.

References

External links
 

1925 births
2008 deaths
Austrian male cyclists
Olympic cyclists of Austria
Cyclists at the 1948 Summer Olympics
People from Judenburg
Sportspeople from Styria